Goodenia bicolor is a species of flowering plant in the family Goodeniaceae and is endemic to north-western Australia. It is an annual or ephemeral herb with lance-shaped to egg-shaped leaves with the narrower end towards the base, racemes of yellow or yellow and purple flowers and elliptical fruit.

Description

Taxonomy and naming
Goodenia bicolor was first formally described in 1859 by George Bentham in Flora Australiensis from an unpublished description by Ferdinand von Mueller. The specific epithet (bicolor) means "two-coloured".

Distribution and habitat
This goodenia grows in seasonally damp areas in northern Western Australia and the north-west of the Northern Territory.

Conservation status
Goodenia bicolor is classified as "not threatened" by the Western Australian Government Department of Parks and Wildlife, and as of "least concern" under the Northern Territory Government Territory Parks and Wildlife Conservation Act 1976.

References

bicolor
Eudicots of Western Australia
Flora of the Northern Territory
Plants described in 1868
Taxa named by Ferdinand von Mueller
Taxa named by George Bentham